Winding Road may refer to:

 Winding Road (magazine), a digital automotive enthusiast magazine
 "Winding Road" (Ayaka and Kobukuro song), 2007
 "Winding Road" (Porno Graffitti song), 2006
 "Winding Road", a song by Ayumi Hamasaki from the album My Story
 The Winding Road, a 1920 British silent film
 Hairpin turn